Friedrich Karl of Limburg Stirum, count of Limburg Styrum and Bronckhorst, sovereign lord of Gemen, son of Otto Leopold of Limburg Stirum, was born in 1710.

He was lord of Gemen between 1743 and 1771. He died in 1771 without descendants. Gemen passed to his brother.

Friedrich Karl
1710 births
1771 deaths